Günter Jochems (5 November 1928 – 30 March 1991) was a professional ice hockey player. He represented Germany in the 1956 Winter Olympics.

References

External links
 

1928 births
1991 deaths
German ice hockey centres
Ice hockey players at the 1956 Winter Olympics
Olympic ice hockey players of Germany
Olympic ice hockey players of the United Team of Germany
People from Crimmitschau
Sportspeople from Saxony